Louis Legrand (1863–1951), was a French artist known especially for his aquatint engravings

Louis Legrand may also refer to:

Louis Legrand (theologian) (1711-1780), French Sulpician priest and theologian, and a Doctor of the Sorbonne
Louis Legrand (photographer) (19th century), French photographer
Metta Victoria Fuller Victor (1831–1885), American novelist who used the nom de plume Louis Legrand among others

See also
Lycée Louis-le-Grand, a French secondary school